Comparison test can mean:

 Limit comparison test, a method of testing for the convergence of an infinite series.
 Direct comparison test, a way of deducing the convergence or divergence of an infinite series or an improper integral.